William Mundy may refer to:

 William Mundy (composer) (c. 1529–1591), English composer
 William Mundy (MP) (1801–1877), English MP

See also 
 Bill Mundy (disambiguation)
 Mundy (surname)